Harry Freeman-Jackson (23 December 1910 – 21 July 1993) was an Irish equestrian. He competed at the 1952, 1956, 1960 and the 1964 Summer Olympics.

References

External links
 

1910 births
1993 deaths
Irish male equestrians
Olympic equestrians of Ireland
Equestrians at the 1952 Summer Olympics
Equestrians at the 1956 Summer Olympics
Equestrians at the 1960 Summer Olympics
Equestrians at the 1964 Summer Olympics
Sportspeople from Rawalpindi